Elections to Cookstown District Council were held on 19 May 1993 on the same day as the other Northern Irish local government elections. The election used three district electoral areas to elect a total of 16 councillors.

Election results

Note: "Votes" are the first preference votes.

Districts summary

|- class="unsortable" align="centre"
!rowspan=2 align="left"|Ward
! % 
!Cllrs
! % 
!Cllrs
! %
!Cllrs
! %
!Cllrs
! % 
!Cllrs
!rowspan=2|TotalCllrs
|- class="unsortable" align="center"
!colspan=2 bgcolor="" | SDLP
!colspan=2 bgcolor="" | UUP
!colspan=2 bgcolor="" | DUP
!colspan=2 bgcolor="" | Sinn Féin
!colspan=2 bgcolor="white"| Others
|-
|align="left"|Ballinderry
|bgcolor="#99FF66"|33.0
|bgcolor="#99FF66"|2
|21.0
|2
|22.6
|1
|23.4
|1
|0.0
|0
|6
|-
|align="left"|Cookstown Central
|30.9
|2
|bgcolor="40BFF5"|37.6
|bgcolor="40BFF5"|2
|15.8
|1
|13.8
|0
|1.9
|0
|5
|-
|align="left"|Drum Manor
|bgcolor="#99FF66"|25.6
|bgcolor="#99FF66"|1
|22.4
|1
|12.6
|1
|23.9
|1
|15.5
|1
|5
|- class="unsortable" class="sortbottom" style="background:#C9C9C9"
|align="left"| Total
|30.0
|5
|26.5
|5
|17.5
|3
|20.7
|2
|5.3
|1
|16
|-
|}

District results

Ballinderry

1989: 2 x SDLP, 2 x DUP, 1 x DUP, 1 x Sinn Féin
1993: 2 x SDLP, 2 x UUP, 1 x DUP, 1 x Sinn Féin
1989-1993 Change: UUP gain from DUP

Cookstown Central

1989: 2 x SDLP, 2 x DUP, 1 x UUP
1993: 2 x SDLP, 2 x UUP, 1 x DUP
1989-1993 Change: UUP gain from DUP

Drum Manor

1989: 1 x Sinn Féin, 1 x UUP, 1 x SDLP, 1 x DUP, 1 x Independent Unionist
1993: 1 x Sinn Féin, 1 x UUP, 1 x SDLP, 1 x DUP, 1 x Independent Unionist
1989-1993 Change: No change

References

Cookstown District Council elections
Cookstown